Tim Storm (born 19 July 1956) is a Canadian rower. He competed in the men's double sculls event at the 1984 Summer Olympics.

References

External links
 

1956 births
Living people
Canadian male rowers
Olympic rowers of Canada
Rowers at the 1984 Summer Olympics
Sportspeople from Rotterdam
Pan American Games medalists in rowing
Pan American Games gold medalists for Canada
Rowers at the 1979 Pan American Games